Corona is a Star Trek: The Original Series novel written by Greg Bear.

Plot
A sentient force of protostars, called 'Corona', endangers a team of Vulcan scientists. Captain Kirk and the USS Enterprise arrive, their onboard situation complicated by a female reporter and a new computer system that can override Kirk's commands. The situation further degrades when it is learned the protostars might restart the entire universe.

Reviews
Review by Glenn Reed (1984) in Fantasy Review, September 1984

External links

Novels based on Star Trek: The Original Series
1984 American novels
American science fiction novels
Novels by Greg Bear